"Fuckin' Problems" (edited version titled as "F**kin' Problems", and "Problems") is a song by American rapper ASAP Rocky featuring Canadian rapper Drake and fellow American rappers 2 Chainz and Kendrick Lamar. It was released on October 24, 2012, as the second single from Rocky's debut studio album Long. Live. ASAP (2013), and was later released to radio on November 27, 2012.

Noah "40" Shebib assisted the artists in writing the song and also serves as co-producer alongside Drake, who uses the pseudonym C. Papi. Static Major receives posthumous songwriting credits for the sampling of his unreleased composition for Aaliyah entitled "Don't Be Jealous" (which was leaked in January 2013 under title "Quit Hatin'"). Though uncredited, the song also interpolates Ol' Dirty Bastard's "Shimmy Shimmy Ya". The song was nominated for a Grammy Award for Best Rap Song.

Background
The song was initially recorded by Drake for his album Nothing Was the Same in a studio session with rapper 2 Chainz. Drake felt like the song was a throwaway so he wanted to give the song to "somebody who was poppin" and gave it to Kendrick Lamar. Lamar recorded his verse on the song but decided not to use the song for his album good kid, m.A.A.d city as he thought the song would not fit into the album so he returned the song back to Drake again. Drake then finally let ASAP Rocky keep the song along with all the verses to use for his debut album Long. Live. ASAP.

Music video
The music video, directed by Sam Lecca and Clark Jackson, premiered on December 3, 2012 on 106 & Park.

Remixes
Young Money rapper Tyga has a freestyle to the song on his 2012 mixtape, 187. Lil Wayne freestyled over the beat on his Dedication 5 mixtape along with Kidd Kidd and Euro. Other freestyles and remixes to the song have been done by Rick Ross (with Stalley), Trey Songz, Joell Ortiz and Kevin McCall, among others.

Critical reception
Complex named the song number 21 on their list of the 50 best songs of 2012. Pitchfork ranked it at number 35 on their list of the top 100 songs of 2013. XXL positioned it at number 14 on their list of the best songs of the year.

Chart performance
The song has sold over two million digital copies in the US as of October 2013. The song has since peaked at number 8 on the Billboard Hot 100 chart, and is the most successful song on the album. It is also Rocky's most successful song as a lead artist.

Charts

Weekly charts

Year-end charts

Certifications

Release history

References

2012 songs
2012 singles
ASAP Rocky songs
Drake (musician) songs
2 Chainz songs
Kendrick Lamar songs
Songs written by ASAP Rocky
Songs written by Drake (musician)
Songs written by Kendrick Lamar
Songs written by 2 Chainz
Songs written by 40 (record producer)
Songs written by Static Major
Song recordings produced by 40 (record producer)
Dirty rap songs
RCA Records singles